The Fiat Pratola Serra modular engines (also known as family B engines for the 4 cylinder units, and family C engines for the 5 cylinder units) are a family of engines produced by the Fiat Group since 1994 and used in Fiat, Alfa Romeo, Lancia and Jeep vehicles. They are named after the Pratola Serra municipality in which they're being produced.

Story
This new engine family debuted with the Lancia Kappa, and were designed to allow the production of different units, both diesel and petrol, in various displacements and configurations while decreasing development and production costs thanks to the modular architecture.

Five cylinder launch versions:

These engines are produced in the FGA's FMA (Fabbrica Motori Automobilistici) factory in Pratola Serra. It's an advanced factory, with a production capacity of 600,000 engines/year and producing both petrol and Diesel engines.

Started in 1993, it was developed to produce multiple engines with a single production line, sharing components between them.

In 2010 the Chinese GAC Group started production of 1.8 and 2.0 Alfa Romeo Twin Spark 16V configurations of the Pratola Serra modular engine branded as "VTML" in China. These engines constitute however unique configurations, mating the single spark plug cylinder head from the 1.8 16V VFD to the 1747 and 1970 Twin Spark engine blocks, the latter with balance shafts, while retaining the power levels of the Twin Spark 16V. While these engines have been phased out in the European market in favor of the 1.4 MultiAir Turbo gasoline engine, part of the smaller Fiat FIRE series, they have later been updated with dual variable valve timing (branded "DCVVT") and turbochargers, and are as of 2016 used in Trumpchi automobiles.

Engine specifications
Engine blocks are produced in four- and five-cylinder versions with similar specs, usually made from cast iron, with five main bearings for the four cylinder versions and six main bearings for the five cylinder versions. Exceptions are the later version of the petrol  and the diesel  four-cylinder blocks, made from aluminum. They are developed to withstand turbocharging. Some versions have counter-rotating balance shafts to reduce vibrations. The aluminium pistons have graphite skirts to reduce internal engine friction.

Cylinder heads are made in aluminum alloy. Petrol versions have an integrated coolant pump and pentroof combustion chambers with an angle of 47° between valves. The turbodiesels have a different, flat combustion chamber design.

They usually have a DOHC valvetrain configuration with hydraulic tappets, driving four valves per cylinder. Exceptions are the 1.4 12V unit, also with hydraulic tappets but a SOHC valvetrain, driving three valves per cylinder, and the 1.9 8V and 2.4 10V turbodiesels, with a SOHC valvetrain with mechanical tappets, driving two valves per cylinder. The 1750 TBi gasoline and 16V Multijet diesel engines feature hydraulic tappets with roller rocker arms. Some versions feature variable valve timing (VVT). The camshafts are belt-driven.

In addition to VVT, some versions also feature variable-length intake manifold (VIS).

Earlier Alfa Romeo versions use the Twin Spark ignition system. There is also a version of the four cylinder  block using direct injection, used only in Alfa Romeo's vehicles, dubbed as JTS.

In Brazil, the 5-cylinder petrol engines equipped the Marea sedan and station wagon (Marea Weekend) lines between 1998 and 2006, including a 2.0 20V with deactivated VVT (125 PS) for lower taxation, 2.0 20V VVT (140 PS), 2.4 20V with VVT and VIS (157 PS) and a turbocharged 2.0 20V (180 PS) - detuned from the 220 PS version from Fiat Coupé. A slightly updated version of the 2.4 20V was also used on the Stilo Abarth with 165 PS.

Engine blocks

Current production

Fiat applications

Lancia applications

Alfa Romeo applications

Jeep applications

Applications in other brands

See also
 Alfa Romeo Twin Cam engine
 Alfa Romeo Twin Spark engine
 Fiat Twin Cam engine
 Fully Integrated Robotised Engine
 JTD engine

Fiat engines
Gasoline engines by model
Straight-four engines
Straight-five engines